St. George's Church was a wooden Orthodox church in the village of Zavorychi, Brovary Raion, Kyiv Oblast, Ukraine.

History 
The church was built in 1873.

On 7 March 2022, during the 2022 Russian invasion of Ukraine, the church was destroyed by Russian forces.

References

External links 

  

1873 establishments in Ukraine
2022 disestablishments in Ukraine
Attacks on churches in Europe
Buildings and structures in Kyiv Oblast
Wooden churches in Ukraine
Ukrainian Orthodox Church (Moscow Patriarchate) church buildings
Buildings and structures destroyed during the 2022 Russian invasion of Ukraine
Brovary Raion
Demolished churches in Ukraine